Lars Bergseng (born May 14, 1963) is a former Norwegian ice hockey player. He was born in Lillehammer, Norway and is the brother of Arne Bergseng. He played for the Norwegian national ice hockey team at the 1988 Winter Olympics.

References

External links

1963 births
Living people
Furuset Ishockey players
Ice hockey players at the 1988 Winter Olympics
Lillehammer IK players
Norwegian ice hockey players
Olympic ice hockey players of Norway
Sportspeople from Lillehammer
Storhamar Dragons players